Amid al-Kharij is a sub-district located in al-Sayyani District, Ibb Governorate, Yemen. Amid al-Kharij had a population of 7357 according to the 2004 census.

References 

Sub-districts in As Sayyani District